Lake Retba, also known as Lac Rose (meaning "pink lake"), lies north of the Cap Vert peninsula in Senegal, some  north-east of the capital, Dakar, in northwest Africa. It is named for its pink waters caused by Dunaliella salina algae and is known for its high salt content, up to 40% in some areas. Its colour is usually particularly strong from late January to early March, during the dry season; however, flooding in September 2022 not only disrupted salt harvesting activities on the lake, but because it caused the lake to lose its colour, had a negative effect on tourism.

The lake is  under consideration by UNESCO as a World Heritage Site.

Description
The algae produce a red pigment to help them absorb sunlight, which gives them energy to create ATP. The color is particularly visible during the dry season (from November to May) and less visible during the rainy season (June to October).

Magenta-coloured samphire bushes flourish in the lake’s white sandbanks; the sand dunes are terra-cotta-coloured.

Salt
The lake is known for its high salt content (up to 40% in some areas), which is mainly due to the ingress of seawater and its subsequent evaporation. Like the Dead Sea, the lake is sufficiently buoyant that people can float easily.

Salt is exported across the region by up to 3,000 collectors, men and women from all over western Africa, who work 6–7 hours a day. They protect their skin with beurre de Karité (shea butter), an emollient produced from shea nuts which helps avoid tissue damage. The salt is used by Senegalese fishermen to preserve fish, which is an ingredient in many traditional recipes, including the national dish, which is a fish and rice combination called thieboudienne. About 38,000 tonnes of salt are harvested from this lake each year, which contributes to Senegal's salt production industry. Senegal is the number-one producer of salt in Africa.

Its colour is usually particularly strong from late January to early March, during the dry season. However, extensive flooding in September 2022 caused an above-average influx of fresh water into the lake, and it lost is characteristic pink hue. This has had an impact on both tourism (the attraction being the pink colour) and salt harvesting, as many of the salt banks were swept away.

Wildlife 
Despite the high salinity of the lake, which can reach as high as 350 g/L during the dry season, blackchin tilapia have been found living in brackish sections fed fresh water by an intermittent creek.

World heritage listing
Lake Retba has been under consideration by UNESCO as a World Heritage Site since October 2005, and remains so .

Motorsport
The lake was often the finishing point of the Dakar Rally, before the rally moved to South America in 2009.

In 2021, it hosted a round of the Extreme E electric off-road racing series.

See also
 Pink lake
 Sir Michael Tippett, who composed The Rose Lake after seeing it

Further reading

References

External links 
Lake Retba
Senegal’s Pink Lake. Al Jazeera English, October 2021 (video, 46 mins)

Lakes of Senegal
Saline lakes of Africa